Pacific Union School District may refer to:

 Pacific Union School District (Arcata, California)
 Pacific Union School District (Fresno, California)